Margaret de Bohun, Countess of Devon (3 April 1311 – 16 December 1391) was the granddaughter of King Edward I and Eleanor of Castile, and the wife of Hugh Courtenay, 10th Earl of Devon (1303–1377). Her seventeen children included an Archbishop of Canterbury and six knights, of whom two were founder knights of the Order of the Garter. Unlike most women of her day, she received a classical education and was a lifelong scholar and collector of books.

Early life
Lady Margaret de Bohun was born on 3 April 1311 at Caldecote, Northamptonshire, the third daughter and seventh child of Humphrey de Bohun, 4th Earl of Hereford, Lord Constable of England by his wife Elizabeth of Rhuddlan, the youngest daughter of King Edward I and Eleanor of Castile. Her paternal grandparents were Humphrey de Bohun, 3rd Earl of Hereford and Maud de Fiennes. She was named after her maternal step-grandmother, Margaret of France, the second queen consort of Edward I.

Margaret was left an orphan shortly before her eleventh birthday. On 16 March 1322 at the Battle of Boroughbridge, her father was slain in an ambush by the Welsh. Her mother had died six years previously in childbirth.

Together with her siblings she received a classical education under a Sicilian Greek, Master Diogenes. As a result, Margaret became a lifelong scholar and avid book collector.

On 11 August 1325, at the age of fourteen, Lady Margaret married Hugh de Courtenay, the future 10th Earl of Devon, to whom she had been betrothed since 27 September 1314. Her dowry included the manor of Powderham near Exeter. The marriage agreement was formally made on 28 February 1315, when she was not quite four years old. The first earl of Devon promised that upon the marriage he would enfeoff his son and Margaret jointly with 400 marks' worth of land, assessed at its true value, and in a suitable place.

Margaret assumed the title of Countess of Devon on 23 December 1340.

Her eldest brother John de Bohun (23 November 1306 – 20 January 1336) succeeded as 5th Earl of Hereford in 1326, having married Alice Fitzalan, daughter of the 9th Earl of Arundel in 1325. She had a younger brother, William de Bohun (1312–1360), who was created 1st Earl of Northampton in 1337 by King Edward III. He married Elizabeth de Badlesmere, by whom he had two children. Margaret's elder sister Lady Eleanor de Bohun (17 October 1304 – 7 October 1363) married, in 1327, her first husband, James Butler, 1st Earl of Ormonde. They were the ancestors of queens Anne Boleyn and Catherine Parr.

Hugh and Margaret had 17 known children, most of whom reached adulthood. Their descendants include members of the British royal family and former British Prime Minister, Sir Winston Churchill.

Their family chantry was expanded at Naish Priory in the family's manor of Coker in Somerset, at the end of the 14th century when it was owned by her most notable son, William Courtenay, Archbishop of Canterbury.

Margaret died on 16 December 1391 at the age of eighty. She is buried in Exeter Cathedral.

Marriage and issue
On 11 August 1325, in accordance with a marriage agreement dated 27 September 1314, she married Hugh Courtenay, 10th Earl of Devon (1303–1377), by whom she had eight sons and nine daughters:

Sir Hugh Courtenay (1326/7–1348), KG, eldest son and heir, who died shortly before Easter term, 1348, having predeceased his father. He married, before 3 September 1341, Elizabeth de Vere (d. 16 August 1375), daughter of John de Vere, 7th Earl of Oxford, and Maud de Badlesmere, daughter of Bartholomew de Badlesmere, 1st Baron Badlesmere, by whom he had an only son, Hugh Courtenay, 3rd Baron Courtenay, (d. without issue 20 February 1374). After the death of Sir Hugh Courtenay, his widow, Elizabeth, married successively John de Mowbray, 3rd Baron Mowbray (d. 4 October 1361), and Sir William de Cossington.
Thomas Courtenay (c. 1329/31 – 1381), canon of Crediton and Exeter and MP for Devon in 1377.
Sir Edward Courtenay (c. 1331 – 1368/71), who was born about 1331 at Haccombe, Devon, and died between 2 February 1368 and 1 April 1371, having predeceased his father. He married Emeline Dawney (c. 1329 – 28 February 1371) in or before 1346, daughter and heiress of Sir John Dawney (d. 1346/47) of Mudford Terry, Somerset, and had issue:
Edward Courtenay, 11th Earl of Devon (d. 1419), who married Maud Camoys. The earldom remained in their descendants until their great-grandson, Thomas Courtenay, 14th Earl of Devon, was beheaded at York on 3 April 1461 after the Battle of Towton, dying without issue. All his honours were forfeited by attainder, and the earldom eventually passed, after a brief period of confusion during the Wars of the Roses (for which see Earl of Devon), by a new creation in 1485 to Edward Courtenay, 1st Earl of Devon (d. 1509), the grandson of Sir Hugh Courtenay of Haccombe and Bampton (1358–1425), brother of the 11th Earl.
Sir Hugh Courtenay of Haccombe and Bampton (1358–1425), whose grandson was Edward Courtenay, 1st Earl of Devon (d. 1509).
Robert Courtenay.
William Courtenay (c. 1342 – 31 July 1396), Archbishop of Canterbury.
Sir Philip Courtenay (c. 1345 – 29 July 1406), of Powderham, who married Ann Wake, daughter of Sir Thomas Wake by Alice Patteshull, daughter of Sir John de Patteshull.
Sir Peter Courtenay (d. 2 February 1405), KG, of Hardington Mandeville, Somerset, who married Margaret Clyvedon, widow of Sir John de Saint Loe (d. 8 November 1375), and daughter and heiress of John de Clyvedon.
Humphrey Courtenay, who died young without issue.
Margaret Courtenay (the elder), (born c. 1328 – died 2 Aug 1395), who married John de Cobham, 3rd Baron Cobham.
Elizabeth Courtenay (d. 7 August 1395), who married, firstly, Sir John de Vere (d. before 23 June 1350) of Whitchurch, Buckinghamshire, eldest son and heir apparent of John de Vere, 7th Earl of Oxford, by Maud de Badlesmere, and, secondly, Sir Andrew Luttrell of Chilton, in Thorverton, Devon.
Katherine Courtenay (d. 31 December 1399), who married, before 18 October 1353, Thomas Engaine, 2nd Baron Engaine (d. 29 June 1367), by whom she had no issue.
Anne Courtenay.
Joan Courtenay, who married, before 1367, Sir John de Cheverston (died c. 1375), by whom she had no issue.
Margaret Courtenay (the younger), (1342x1350 – after July 1381), who married Sir Theobald Grenville II (died by July 1381).
__ Courtenay (7th daughter)
__ Courtenay (8th daughter)
__ Courtenay (9th daughter)

Ancestry

References

Bibliography

 Risdon, Tristram, The Chorographical Description or Survey of the County of Devon, pp. 357–360, Google Books, retrieved on 4 November 2009

1311 births
1391 deaths
Margaret
Margaret
Devon, Margaret De Bohun, 2nd Countess of
Daughters of British earls
Burials at Exeter Cathedral
Margaret
14th-century English people
14th-century English women